The 1968 College Football All-America team is composed of college football players who were selected as All-Americans by various organizations that chose College Football All-America Teams in 1968.

The NCAA recognizes six selectors as "official" for the 1968 season.  They are (1) the American Football Coaches Association (AFCA), (2) the Associated Press (AP), (3) the Central Press Association (CP), (4) the Football Writers Association of America (FWAA), (5) the Newspaper Enterprise Association (NEA), and (6) the United Press International (UPI). Four of the six teams (AP, UPI, NEA, and FWAA) were selected by polling of sports writers and/or broadcasters. The Central Press team was selected with input from the captains of the major college teams.  The AFCA team was based on a poll of coaches.  Other notable selectors, though not recognized by the NCAA as official, included Football News, a national weekly football publication, Time magazine, The Sporting News (TSN), and the Walter Camp Football Foundation (WC).

No single team dominated the All-America selections in 1968 with Ohio State and Notre Dame both having three first-team players.

Offensive selections

Ends 

 Ted Kwalick, Penn State (College Football Hall of Fame) (AFCA [tight end], AP-1 [tight end], CP-1, FWAA, NEA-1 [tight end], UPI-1, Time, TSN, WC)
 Jerry Levias, SMU (College Football Hall of Fame) (AFCA [flanker], AP-2, CP-1, FWAA, NEA-1 [split end], UPI-2, FN [flanker], WC, WC)
 Ron Sellers, Florida State (College Football Hall of Fame) (AFCA [split end], AP-1 [split end], CP-2, NEA-2, UPI-2, FN, Time, TSN)
 Jim Seymour, Notre Dame (AFCA [split end], AP-2, CP-2, UPI-1, FN, TSN, WC)
 Steve Zabel, Oklahoma (NEA-2 [tight end])
 Gene Washington, Stanford (AP-3, CP-3)
 Eddie Hinton, Oklahoma (AP-3)

Tackles 

 George Kunz, Notre Dame (AFCA, AP-2, CP-1, FWAA, NEA-1, UPI-1, FN, Time, TSN, WC)
 Dave Foley, Ohio State  (AFCA, AP-1, CP-1, FWAA, NEA-1, UPI-1, FN, Time, WC)
 Rufus Mayes, Ohio State (AP-2, CP-2, NEA-2, UPI-2, Time, TSN)
 Malcolm Snider, Stanford (NEA-2)
 Ken Carmon, Ohio  (AP-3, CP-3)
 Greg Shelly, Virginia (AP-3)
 Jim Anderson, Missouri (CP-3)

Guards 

 Charles Rosenfelder, Tennessee (AFCA, AP-1, CP-1, FWAA, NEA-1, UPI-1, FN, WC)
 Jim Barnes, Arkansas (AP-1, CP-1, NEA-2, UPI-2)
 Mike Montler, Colorado (AFCA, AP-1 [tackle], CP-2 [tackle], UPI-2 [tackle])
 Guy Dennis, Florida (CP-2, NEA-2, UPI-1, FN, WC)
 John Shinners, Xavier (NEA-1, Time, TSN)
 Joe Armstrong, Nebraska (AP-2, CP-2, FWAA)
 Malcolm Snider, Stanford (TSN)
 Don King, Texas Tech (AP-2, CP-3)
 Ken Mendenhall, Oklahoma (UPI-2)
 Gary Roberts, Purdue (AP-3)
 Alvin Samples, Alabama (AP-3)
 John Miller, Lehigh (CP-3)

Centers 

 John Didion, Oregon State (AFCA, AP-1, CP-1, FWAA, NEA-1, UPI-1, FN, Time, TSN, WC)
 Carey Matts, North Carolina State (AP-2)
 Jon Kolb, Oklahoma State (AP-3, CP-2, NEA-2, UPI-2)
 Jerry Murphy, Brown (CP-3)

Quarterbacks 

 Terry Hanratty, Notre Dame (AFCA [tie], AP-1, CP-1, FWAA, NEA-2, UPI-1, FN, Time, TSN, WC)
 Bobby Douglass, Kansas (AFCA [tie], AP-2, NEA-1, UPI-2)
 Greg Cook, Cincinnati (CP-2)
 Steve Sogge, USC (AP-3)
 Brian Dowling, Yale (CP-3)

Running backs 

 O. J. Simpson, USC  (College and Pro Football Halls of Fame)(AFCA [halfback], AP-1, CP-1 [halfback], FWAA, NEA-1, UPI-1, FN [halfback], Time, TSN, WC)
 Leroy Keyes, Purdue (College Football Hall of Fame) (AFCA [halfback], AP-1, CP-1 [halfback], FWAA, NEA-1 [defensive back], UPI-1, FN [halfback], Time, TSN [cornerback], WC)
 Chris Gilbert, Texas (College Football Hall of Fame) (AFCA [halfback], AP-1, CP-3, NEA-1 [halfback], UPI-2, FN [halfback])
 Bill Enyart, Oregon State (College Football Hall of Fame) (AP-3, CP-1 [fullback], NEA-2 [fullback], UPI-1, Time, TSN [linebacker])
 Paul Gipson, Houston (AFCA [fullback], AP-2, CP-3, NEA-1 [fullback], Time)
 Ron Johnson, Michigan (College Football Hall of Fame) (AP-2, CP-2, FWAA, NEA-2, UPI-2, FN [halfback])
 Larry Smith, Florida (TSN)
 Steve Owens, Oklahoma (College Football Hall of Fame) (AP-2, CP-2, FN [halfback])
 Mercury Morris, West Texas State (AP-3, CP-3, NEA-2, UPI-2, FN [halfback])
 Charley Jarvis, Army (AP-3) 
 Jim Otis, Ohio State (CP-2)

Defensive selections

Defensive ends 

 Ted Hendricks, Miami (FL) (College and Pro Football Halls of Fame) (AFCA, AP-1, CP-1, FWAA, NEA-1, UPI-1, FN, Time, TSN, WC)
 John Zook, Kansas (AFCA, AP-1, CP-1, FWAA, NEA-2, UPI-1, FN)
 Bob Stein, Minnesota (AP-3, UPI-2, WC)
 Ron Carpenter, North Carolina State (NEA-1)
 Jim Gunn (AP-2)
 Mike Ford, Alabama (AP-2, UPI-2)
 Bill Payne, Georgia (AP-3)

Defensive tackles 

 Bill Stanfill, Georgia (College Football Hall of Fame) (AFCA, AP-1, CP-1, FWAA, NEA-2 [defensive end], UPI-1, FN, Time, TSN, WC)
 Joe Greene, North Texas State (College and Pro Football Halls of Fame) (AP-1, NEA-1, UPI-1, FN, Time, TSN, WC)
 Loyd Wainscott, Texas (AP-2, CP-1, FWAA)
 Rolf Krueger, Texas A&M (UPI-2, Time, TSN)
 David Campbell, Auburn (AP-3, NEA-1)
 Mike Reid, Penn State (AP-2, NEA-2)
 Tom Nelson, Arizona (AP-3, NEA-2)
 Art Thoms, Syracuse (UPI-2)

Middle guards 

 Ed White, California (College Football Hall of Fame) (AFCA [defensive tackle], AP-1, CP-1, [guard], FWAA, NEA-1, UPI-2, FN)
 Chuck Kyle, Purdue (AFCA, AP-2, CP-1 [guard], FWAA, UPI-1, WC)
 Ernie Calloway, Texas Southern (NEA-2)
 Carl Crennel, West Virginia (AP-3)

Linebackers 

 Dennis Onkotz, Penn State (College Football Hall of Fame) (AP-1, FWAA, UPI-1, FN, WC)
 Steve Kiner, Tennessee (College Football Hall of Fame) (AP-1, CP-1, FWAA, FN)
 Bob Babich, Miami (Ohio) (College Football Hall of Fame) (AFCA, AP-2, Time, TSN)
 Ron Pritchard, Arizona State (College Football Hall of Fame) (AP-2, NEA-1, UPI-2, Time, TSN)
 Mike Hall, Alabama (AP-2, CP-1, NEA-2, WC)
 Ken Johnson, Army (AFCA, NEA-2)
 Mike Widger, Virginia Tech (AP-1)
 Bill Hobbs, Texas A&M (AP-3, UPI-1)
 Chip Healy, Vanderbilt (CP-1)
 Dale McCullers, Florida State (AP-3, NEA-1)
 Jim Sniadecki, Indiana (UPI-2)
 Ken Criter, Wisconsin (AP-3)

Defensive backs 

 Roger Wehrli, Missouri (College and Pro Football Halls of Fame) (AFCA, AP-1, CP-1, FWAA, NEA-1 [safety], UPI-1, FN, Time, TSN, WC)
 Jake Scott, Georgia (College Football Hall of Fame) (AFCA, AP-1, UPI-1, NEA-1, WC, FWAA, FN)
 Al Worley, Washington (AFCA, AP-1, CP-1, NEA-2 [safety], UPI-1, FN)
 Mike Battle, USC (FWAA, UPI-1, FN, WC)
 Al Brenner, Michigan State (AFCA, AP-3, CP-3 [offensive end], NEA-1 [safety], UPI-2)
 Tony Kyasky, Syracuse (AP-2, NEA-2 [safety], UPI-2, WC, Time)
 Jim Marsalis, Tennessee State (NEA-2, Time, TSN)
 Tom Maxwell, Texas A&M (Time, TSN)
 Jim Weatherford, Tennessee (AFCA, UPI-2)
 Ted Provost, Ohio State (AP-2)
 Tom Curtis, Michigan (College Football Hall of Fame) (AP-2, UPI-2)
 Bill Kishman, Colorado State (NEA-2)
 Johnny Peacock, Houston (AP-3)
 Jim Livingston, Southern Methodist (AP-3)

Special teams

Kicker 

 Kenny Vinyard, Texas Tech (TSN)

Punter 

 Steve O'Neal, Texas A&M (TSN)

Key 
 Bold – Consensus All-American
 -1 – First-team selection
 -2 – Second-team selection
 -3 – Third-team selection

Official selectors
 AFCA = American Football Coaches Association
 AP = Associated Press
 CP = Central Press Association
 FWAA = Football Writers Association of America
 NEA = Newspaper Enterprise Association
 UPI = United Press International

Unofficial selectors
 FN = The Football News, consisting of the 33 best college football players as selected by the staff and correspondents of The Football News
 Time = Time magazine
 TSN = The Sporting News
 WC = Walter Camp Football Foundation

See also
 1968 All-Atlantic Coast Conference football team
 1968 All-Big Eight Conference football team
 1968 All-Big Ten Conference football team
 1968 All-Pacific-8 Conference football team
 1968 All-SEC football team
 1968 All-Southwest Conference football team

References

All-America Team
College Football All-America Teams